University Oval is the name of several sporting fields:

Australia
University Oval (Park 12), Adelaide
University Oval, Sydney
New Zealand
University Oval, Dunedin
South Africa
Absa Puk Oval, Potchefstroom, formerly known as University Oval
United States
Old Oval, former stadium and a central lawn on the Syracuse University campus, formerly known as University Oval